The 1946 Detroit Tigers finished the season with a record of 92–62, twelve games behind the Boston Red Sox.  The season was their 46th since they entered the American League in 1901.

Offseason 
 March 26, 1946: Rip Radcliff was released by the Tigers.

Regular season 
The 1946 Tigers were led by first baseman Hank Greenberg who led the AL with 127 RBIs and led the major leagues with 44 home runs, and by Hal Newhouser who led the major leagues with 26 wins, a 1.94 ERA, an Adjusted ERA+ of 188, and 8.46 strikeouts per nine innings pitched.

Season standings

Record vs. opponents

Roster

Player stats

Batting

Starters by position 
Note: Pos = Position; G = Games played; AB = At bats; H = Hits; Avg. = Batting average; HR = Home runs; RBI = Runs batted in

Other batters 
Note: G = Games played; AB = At bats; H = Hits; Avg. = Batting average; HR = Home runs; RBI = Runs batted in

Note: pitchers' batting statistics not included

Pitching

Starting pitchers 
Note: G = Games pitched; IP = Innings pitched; W = Wins; L = Losses; ERA = Earned run average; SO = Strikeouts

Other pitchers 
Note: G = Games pitched; IP = Innings pitched; W = Wins; L = Losses; ERA = Earned run average; SO = Strikeouts

Relief pitchers 
Note: G = Games pitched; W= Wins; L= Losses; SV = Saves; GF = Games Finished; ERA = Earned run average; SO = Strikeouts

Awards and honors

League leaders 
 Hank Greenberg: MLB leader in home runs (44)
 Hank Greenberg: AL leader in RBIs (127)
 Hank Greenberg: MLB leader in at bats per home run (11.9)
 Art Houtteman: Youngest player in MLB (18)
 Eddie Lake: AL leader in games played (155)
 Eddie Lake: MLB leader in plate appearances (703)
 Eddie Lake: MLB leader in outs (464)
 Eddie Lake: AL leader in power/speed number (10.4)
 Hal Newhouser: MLB leader in ERA (1.94)
 Hal Newhouser: MLB leader in wins (26)
 Hal Newhouser: MLB leader in Adjusted ERA+ (188)
 Hal Newhouser: MLB leader in walks plus hits per 9 innings pitched (1.069)
 Hal Newhouser: MLB leader in hits allowed per 9 innings (6.61)
 Hal Newhouser: MLB leader in strikeouts per 9 innings (8.46)
 Virgil Trucks: MLB leader in home runs allowed (23)

Players ranking among top 100 of all time at position 
The following members of the 1945 Detroit Tigers are among the Top 100 of all time at their position, as ranked by The New Bill James Historical Baseball Abstract in 2001:
 Birdie Tebbetts: 64th best catcher of all time (played 87 games at catcher for 1946 Tigers)
 Hank Greenberg: 8th best first baseman of all time
 George Kell: 30th best third baseman of all time
 Hoot Evers: 100th best left fielder of all time (played 76 games in center field for 1946 Tigers)
 Doc Cramer: 91st best center fielder of all time (played 50 games in center field in 1946 Tigers)
 Barney McCosky: 70th best center fielder of all time (played 24 games in center field for 1946 Tigers)
 Roy Cullenbine: 68th best right fielder of all time (played 69 games in right field for 1946 Tigers)
 Hal Newhouser: 36th best pitcher of all time
 Virgil Trucks: 61st best pitcher of all time
 Tommy Bridges: 77th best pitcher of all time (pitched in 9 games for 1946 Tigers)

Farm system 

LEAGUE CHAMPIONS: Dallas

References

External links

 1946 Detroit Tigers Regular Season Statistics Baseball-Reference.com

Detroit Tigers seasons
Detroit Tigers season
Detroit Tigers
1946 in Detroit